Mucuna bennettii, commonly known as New-Guinea creeper or scarlet jade vine,  is a species of flowering plant in the family Fabaceae, that is native to Papua New Guinea.

The species was formally described by Victorian government botanist Ferdinand von Mueller in 1876.

See also
 Jade vine

References

bennettii